Bahamas Is Afie is the third album from Canadian musician Bahamas, released August 19, 2014 on Brushfire Records.

The album features guest contributions by Don Kerr, Jason Tait and Felicity Williams.

The album won the Juno Award for Adult Alternative Album of the Year at the Juno Awards of 2015, and Afie Jurvanen won Songwriter of the Year for "All the Time", "Bitter Memories" and "Stronger Than That". CBC Radio One's arts and culture magazine show Q also named the album as the best album of 2014.

The album was a longlisted nominee for the 2015 Polaris Music Prize.

Track listing

References

2014 albums
Bahamas (musician) albums
Brushfire Records albums
Juno Award for Adult Alternative Album of the Year albums